This is a list of video games published and/or developed by Gameloft. Platforms are listed in brackets.

0–9
 1 vs. 100 (keypad-based mobile phones)
 9mm (Android, iOS)

A
 Abracadaball (keypad-based mobile phones)
 Air Strike (Series 30+)
 Air Strike 1944: Flight for Freedom (keypad-based mobile phones)
 Alien Quarantine (keypad-based mobile phones, touchscreen Java ME phones, Android)
 Asphalt: Urban GT (keypad-based mobile phones, N-Gage, Nintendo DS (NDS))
 Asphalt: Urban GT 3D (keypad-based mobile phones)
 Asphalt: Urban GT 2 (keypad-based mobile phones, Symbian OS, N-Gage, NDS, PlayStation Portable (PSP))
 Asphalt 3: Street Rules (keypad-based mobile phones, Symbian OS, N-Gage (service), Windows Mobile)
 Asphalt 3: Street Rules 3D / Asphalt 3 3D: Street Rules (keypad-based mobile phones)
 Asphalt 4: Elite Racing (keypad-based mobile phones, iOS, N-Gage (service), Windows Mobile, BlackBerry OS, DSiWare)
 Asphalt 5 (Android, iOS, webOS, Symbian^3, Windows Phone 7, Bada)
 Asphalt 6: Adrenaline (keypad-based mobile phones, Android, iOS, OS X, Symbian^3, webOS, BlackBerry Tablet OS, Bada, Series 30+)
 Asphalt 3D (Nintendo 3DS)
 Asphalt 7: Heat (Android, iOS, BlackBerry 10, Windows Phone 8, Windows 8)
 Asphalt 8: Airborne (Android, iOS, Windows Phone 8, Windows 8, BlackBerry 10, Microsoft Windows)
 Asphalt 9: Legends (Android, iOS, Windows, Xbox, Nintendo Switch)
 Asphalt: Audi RS 3 (iOS)
 Asphalt: Injection (PlayStation Vita (PS Vita))
 Asphalt Nitro (keypad-based mobile phones, Android)
 Asphalt Overdrive (Android, iOS, Windows Phone 8, Windows 8)
 Asphalt: Street Storm Racing (Android, iOS, Windows)
 Asphalt Xtreme (Android, iOS, Windows)
 Assassin's Creed (keypad-based mobile phones, touchscreen Java phones, Android)
 Assassin's Creed: Altaïr's Chronicles (Android, iOS, DS, Palm Pre)
 Assassin's Creed: Brotherhood (keypad-based mobile phones, touchscreen Java phones, Android)
 Assassin's Creed II (keypad-based mobile phones, touchscreen Java phones, Android)
 Assassin's Creed III (keypad-based mobile phones, touchscreen Java phones, Android)
 Assassin's Creed: Revelations (keypad-based mobile phones, touchscreen Java phones, Android)
 Avalanche Snowboarding (keypad-based mobile phones)

B
 Backstab (Android, iOS)
 Battle for the White House (keypad-based mobile phones)
 Beowulf (based on the film of the same name; keypad-based mobile phones)
 Bikini Beach Volleyball (keypad-based mobile phones)
 Blades of Fury (Android, iOS)
 Blitz Brigade (Android, iOS)
 Block Breaker 3: Unlimited (keypad-based mobile phones, Series 30+)
 Block Breaker Deluxe (keypad-based mobile phones, N-Gage, iOS, Nintendo Wii)
 Block Breaker Deluxe 2 (keypad-based mobile phones)
 Block Breaker Valentine (keypad-based mobile phones)
"Blokus" (IOS) 
 Brain Challenge (keypad-based mobile phones, Android, N-Gage, iOS, Wii, DS, PlayStation 3 (PS3), Xbox, PSP)
 Brain Challenge Vol. 2: Stress Management (keypad-based mobile phones, iOS)
 Brain Challenge 3: Think Again! (keypad-based mobile phones)
 Brain Challenge 4: Breaking Limits (keypad-based mobile phones, Android)
 "Bridge Odyssey" (IOS) 
 Brothers in Arms (N-Gage)
 Brothers in Arms: Art of War (keypad-based mobile phones)
 Brothers in Arms DS (DS)
 Brothers in Arms: Earned in Blood (keypad-based mobile phones)
 Brothers in Arms: Hour of Heroes (iOS, Palm Pre (webOS))
 Brothers in Arms 2: Global Front (Android, iOS)
 Brothers in Arms 3: Sons of War (Android, iOS, Windows Phone)
 Bubble Bash (keypad-based mobile phones, iOS)
 Bubble Bash 2 (keypad-based mobile phones, Series 30+)
 Bubble Bash 3 (keypad-based mobile phones, Android)
 Bubble Bash Mania (keypad-based mobile phones, Android)

C
 Cannon Rats (keypad-based mobile phones)
 Captain America (based on the comic book superhero of the same name; Android, iOS)
 Cars: Fast as Lightning (Android, IOS, WindowsPhones)
 Cars: Hotshot Racing (keypad-based mobile phones, Android)
 Castle of Magic (keypad-based mobile phones, KaiOS)
 Catz (keypad-based mobile phones)
 Chess and Backgammon Classics (iOS)
 Chessmaster (keypad-based mobile phones)
 Common Sense
 Cosmic Colony
 Crazy Campus / Campus Nights (keypad-based mobile phones)
 Crystal Monsters (Nintendo DSi)
 CSI: Crime Scene Investigation – The Mobile Game (keypad-based mobile phones)
 CSI: Miami – The Mobile Game (keypad-based mobile phones, iOS)
 CSI: Miami – The Mobile Game: Episode 2 (keypad-based mobile phones)
 CSI: NY – The Mobile Game (keypad-based mobile phones)
 CSI: Slots

D
 Danger Dash (keypad-based mobile phones, Android, Series 30+, KaiOS)
 Date or Ditch (keypad-based mobile phones)
 Date or Ditch 2 (keypad-based mobile phones)
 Dead Rivals (Android, iOS)
 Deal or No Deal (based on the media franchise of the same name; ; United Kingdom)
 Derek Jeter Pro Baseball 2006 (keypad-based mobile phones)
 Derek Jeter Pro Baseball 2007
 Derek Jeter Pro Baseball 2008
 Desperate Housewives: The Game (keypad-based mobile phones)
 Despicable Me: Minion Rush (Android, iOS)
 Diamond Rush (keypad-based mobile phones)
 Diamond Twister (keypad-based mobile phones, iOS)
 Diamond Twister 2 (keypad-based mobile phones, Android, Series 30+)
 Disney Dreamlight Valley (macOS, Steam, Microsoft Windows, iOS, Nintendo Switch, PlayStation 5, PlayStation 4, Xbox One, Xbox Series X|S)
 Disney Getaway Blast (Android, iOS, Microsoft Windows)
 Disney Magic Kingdoms (keypad-base mobile phones, Android, Microsoft Windows, iOS)
 Disney Princess Majestic Quest (Android, iOS, Microsoft Windows)
 DJ Mix Tour (iOS)
 Doodle Jump (keypad-based mobile phones)
 Dogz (keypad-based mobile phones, N-Gage)
 Dogz 2 (keypad-based mobile phones)
 Dogz 3D (keypad-based mobile phones)
 Dragon Mania (keypad-based mobile phones, Android)
 Dragon Mania Legends (Android, Microsoft Windows, iOS)
 Driver (iOS)
 Driver: L.A. Undercover (keypad-based mobile phones)
 Driver: San Francisco (keypad-based mobile phones)
 Dungeon Hunter (iOS)
 Dungeon Hunter 2 (Android, iOS)
 Dungeon Hunter 4 (Android, iOS)
 Dungeon Hunter 5 (Android, Windows Phone, Windows 10, iOS, PlayStation 4 (PS4), PS Vita)
 Dungeon Hunter: Alliance (PlayStation Network, Mac OS X, PS Vita)
 Dungeon Hunter Champions: Epic Online Action RPG (Android, Microsoft Windows, iOS)
 Dungeon Hunter: Curse of Heaven (keypad-based mobile phones)
 Dungeon Hunter III (keypad-based mobile phones, Android, iOS)

E
 Earthworm Jim (keypad-based mobile phones, iOS, Palm Pre, DSiWare)
 Earthworm Jim HD (PlayStation Network, Xbox Live (Arcade)
 Eternal Legacy (Android, iOS)
 Everyday English Trainer (keypad-based mobile phones)

F
 Fashion Icon (keypad-based mobile phones)
 Fast Five (keypad-based mobile phones, iOS, Android)
 Fast & Furious 6 (keypad-based mobile phones)
 Ferrari GT: Evolution (keypad-based mobile phones, iOS)
 Ferrari GT 2: Revolution (keypad-based mobile phones)
 Ferrari GT 3: World Track (keypad-based mobile phones)
 Ferrari World Championship (keypad-based mobile phones)
 Ferrari World Championship 2009: The Mobile Game (keypad-based mobile phones)

G
 Gameloft Classics (Android)
 Gangstar 2: Kings of L.A. (keypad-based mobile phones, Android, BlackBerry, DSiWare)
 Gangstar City (keypad-based mobile phones, Android)
 Gangstar: Crime City (keypad-based mobile phones)
 Gangstar: Miami Vindication (keypad-based mobile phones, touchscreen Java phones, Android, iOS)
 Gangstar: New Orleans (Android, Microsoft Windows, iOS)
 Gangstar Rio: City of Saints (keypad-based mobile phones, touchscreen Java phones, Android, iOS, Xperia Play)
 Gangstar: Samurai (Japanese keypad-based mobile phones)
 Gangstar Vegas (Android, iOS)
 Gangstar: West Coast Hustle (Android, iOS, Palm Pre)
 Gods of Rome (Android, iOS)
 Golden Balls
 Green Farm (keypad-based mobile phones, Android, iOS, Adobe Flash, Windows Phone)
 Green Farm 2
 Green Farm 3 (keypad-based mobile phones, Android, iOS)
 Grey's Anatomy (keypad-based mobile phones)
 Guitar Rock Tour (keypad-based mobile phones, iOS, DS, DSiWare)
 Guitar Rock Tour 2 (keypad-based mobile phones, iOS)
 GT Racing: Motor Academy (Android, Symbian OS, iOS)
 GT Racing 2: The Real Car Experience (keypad-based mobile phones, Android, Microsoft Windows)

H
 Harry Potter and the Deathly Hallows – Part 2 (keypad-based mobile phones)
 Hero of Sparta (keypad-based mobile phones, Android, iOS, PSP)
 Hero of Sparta II (iOS)
 Heroes of The Dark (iOS, Android, PC)
 Heroes: The Mobile Game (keypad-based mobile phones)
 High School Hook Ups (keypad-based mobile phones, Windows Phone)

I
 Ice Age 4: Continental Drift (keypad-based mobile phones)
 Ice Age Adventures
 Ice Age Avalanche
 Ice Age: Scrat-ventures (keypad-based mobile phones, Android)
 Ice Age Village (keypad-based mobile phones, Android, iOS)
 Iron Blade (Android, iOS)
 Iron Man 2 (keypad-based mobile phones, iOS)
 Iron Man 3 (keypad-based mobile phones, Android, iOS)

J
 James Cameron's Avatar: The Game (keypad-based mobile phones, Android, iOS, Palm Pre)
 Jurassic Park (2011) (keypad/Touch-based mobile phones (J2ME))

K
 Kingdoms & Lords (keypad-based mobile phones, Android)
 King Kong: The Official Mobile Game of the Movie (keypad-based mobile phones)
 King Kong Pinball (keypad-based mobile phones)

L
 Las Vegas Nights: Temptations in the City (keypad-based mobile phones)
 Lego Legacy: Heroes Unboxed (Android)
 Lego Star Wars: Castaways (Apple Arcade)
 Let's Golf (iOS, Xperia Play, keypad-based mobile phones)
 Let's Golf 2 (iOS, Android)
 Let's Golf 3 (iOS, Android)
 Little Big City (keypad-based mobile phones, Android)
 Little Big City 2 (keypad-based mobile phones, Android)
 Littlest Pet Shop (keypad-based mobile phones, Android, iOS)
 Lost: The Mobile Game (based on the television series of the same name; keypad-based mobile phones, iOS)
 Lost Planet 2 (keypad-based mobile phones)
 Lumines Mobile (keypad-based mobile phones)

M
 March of Heroes (keypad-based mobile phones)
 Massive Snowboarding (keypad-based mobile phones)
 Medieval Combat: Age of Glory (keypad-based mobile phones)
 Mega Tower Assault (keypad-based mobile phones)
 Men in Black 3
 Miami Nights: Singles in the City (keypad-based mobile phones, DS)
 Miami Nights 2: The City is Yours (keypad-based mobile phones)
 Midnight Bowling (keypad-based mobile phones, iOS, Wii)
 Midnight Bowling 2 (keypad-based mobile phones)
 Midnight Bowling 3 (keypad-based mobile phones)
 Midnight Bowling 3D (keypad-based mobile phones)
 Midnight Casino (keypad-based mobile phones)
 Midnight Darts (keypad-based mobile phones)
 Midnight Hold'em Poker (keypad-based mobile phones)
 Midnight Pool (keypad-based mobile phones, N-Gage, iOS, Wii)
 Midnight Pool 2 (keypad-based mobile phones, Android)
 Midnight Pool 3 (keypad-based mobile phones, Android)
 Midnight Pool 3D (keypad-based mobile phones, Windows)
 Midnight Pool 4 (keypad-based mobile phones, Android)
 Might and Magic (keypad-based mobile phones)
 Might and Magic II (keypad-based mobile phones, DSi)
 Mission Impossible III (keypad-based mobile phones)
 Modern Combat 2: Black Pegasus (keypad-based mobile phones, Android, iOS, BlackBerry PlayBook)
 Modern Combat 3: Fallen Nation (Android, iOS)
 Modern Combat 4: Zero Hour (keypad-based mobile phones, Android, iOS, Windows Phone 8)
 Modern Combat 5: Blackout (Android, iOS, Windows Phone 8)
 Modern Combat: Domination (PS3, Mac OS X)
 Modern Combat: Sandstorm (Android, iOS, Bada, Palm Pre)
 Modern Combat: Versus (Android, Windows, iOS)
 Monster Life (iOS)
 Monsters University (keypad-based mobile phones, Android)
 My Life in New York (keypad-based mobile phones, Android)
 My Little Pony: Friendship Is Magic (Android, iOS, Windows 8)
 Mystery Mansion Pinball (keypad-based mobile phones)

N
 Naval Battle: Mission Commander (keypad-based mobile phones)
 New York Nights: Success in the City (keypad-based mobile phones)
 New York Nights 2: Friends for Life (keypad-based mobile phones, Android)
 NFL 2008 (DS)
 NFL 2009
 NFL 2010 (iOS, Palm Pre)
 NFL HD 2011
 NFL Pro 2012
 Night at the Museum: Battle of the Smithsonian (based on the film of the same name; keypad-based mobile phones)
 Nightmare Creatures (keypad-based mobile phones)
 Ninja Up (Series 30+)
 Nitro Racing (Series 30+)
 NitroStreet Racing (keypad-based mobile phones)
 NitroStreet Racing 2 (keypad-based mobile phones)
 Nitro Street Run 2 (KaiOS)
 N.O.V.A. Near Orbit Vanguard Alliance (keypad-based mobile phones, touchscreen Java phones, Android, iOS, PSP, PS3, Mac OS X, Palm Pre, Bada)
 N.O.V.A. 2: The Hero Rises Again (Android, iOS, BlackBerry PlayBook)
 N.O.V.A. 3 (keypad-based mobile phones, touchscreen Java phones, Android, iOS, BlackBerry PlayBook, BlackBerry 10, Windows Phone, Series 30+)
 N.O.V.A. Legacy (keypad-based mobile phones, touchscreen Java phones, Android, iOS)

O
 Oktoberfest (keypad-based mobile phones)
 Open Season (keypad-based mobile phones)
 Order & Chaos Duels (Android, iOS)
 Order & Chaos 2: Redemption (Android, iOS, Windows Phone, Ouya)
 Order & Chaos Online (Android, iOS, Windows Phone, Ouya)
 The Oregon Trail (keypad-based mobile phones, iOS, Palm Pre)
 The Oregon Trail (Apple Arcade)
 The Oregon Trail 2: Gold Rush (keypad-based mobile phones)
 The Oregon Trail: American Settler (keypad-based mobile phones)

P
 Paddington Run (Android,iOS)
 Paris Hilton's Diamond Quest (keypad-based mobile phones)
 Paris Nights (keypad-based mobile phones)
 Petz (keypad-based mobile phones)
 Pirates of the Seven Seas (keypad-based mobile phones)
 Planet Zero (keypad-based mobile phones)
 Platinum Solitaire (keypad-based mobile phones, iOS)
 Platinum Solitaire 2 (keypad-based mobile phones)
 Platinum Solitaire 3 (keypad-based mobile phones)
 Platinum Sudoku (keypad-based mobile phones, iOS)
 Platinum Sudoku 2 (keypad-based mobile phones, iOS)
 Pop Superstar / American Popstar (keypad-based mobile phones)
 Prince of Persia (2008 reboot; keypad-based mobile phones)
 Prince of Persia Classic (keypad-based mobile phones, PS3, Xbox Live Arcade, PlayStation Store)
 Prince of Persia: Harem Adventures (keypad-based mobile phones)
 Prince of Persia: The Forgotten Sands (keypad-based mobile phones)
 Prince of Persia: The Sands of Time (keypad-based mobile phones)
 Prince of Persia: The Two Thrones (keypad-based mobile phones)
 Prince of Persia: Warrior Within (keypad-based mobile phones, iOS)
 Pro Moto Racing (keypad-based mobile phone)
 Pro Rally Racing (keypad-based mobile phone)
 Pub Mania (keypad-based mobile phones)
 Puzzle Pets (keypad-based mobile phones, Android)

R
 Rail Rider (keypad-based mobile phones)
 Rayman (keypad-based mobile phones, DSiWare, iOS, PSN, Windows, Palm Pilot)
 Rayman 2: The Great Escape (IOS) 
 Rayman 3 (keypad-based mobile phones, N-Gage)
 Rayman Bowling (keypad-based mobile phones)
 Rayman Garden (keypad-based mobile phones)
 Rayman Golf (keypad-based mobile phones)
 Rayman Kart (keypad-based mobile phones)
 Rayman Raving Rabbids (keypad-based mobile phones)
 Rayman Raving Rabbids TV Party (keypad-based mobile phones)
 Real Tennis (iOS)
 Real Football 2004 (keypad-based mobile phones)
 Real Football 2005 (keypad-based mobile phones)
 Real Football 2006 (keypad-based mobile phones)
 Real Football 2007 (keypad-based mobile phones)
 Real Football 2008 (keypad-based mobile phones)
 Real Football 2009 (keypad-based mobile phones, iPod, iOS, Alpha Potato, DS, DSiWare)
 Real Football 2010 (keypad-based mobile phones, iOS)
 Real Football 2011 (keypad-based mobile phones, iOS)
 Real Football 2012 (keypad-based mobile phones, Android, iOS)
 Real Football 2013 (keypad-based mobile phones, Android, iOS)
 Real Football 2014 (keypad-based mobile phones)
 Real Football 2015 (keypad-based mobile phones)
 Real Football 2016 (keypad-based mobile phones)
 Real Football 2017 (keypad-based mobile phones, Android, iOS)
 Real Football 2018 (keypad-based mobile phones)
 Real Football 2019 (keypad-based mobile phones, Android, iOS)
 Real Football 2020 (keypad-based mobile phones, Android, iOS)
 Real Football 2021 (keypad-based mobile phones, Android, iOS)
 Real Football 2022 (keypad-based mobile phones, Android, iOS)
 Rio Village
 Rise of Lost Empires (keypad-based mobile phones,IOS)
 Rival Knights (Android, iOS)
 Rival Wheels (keypad-based mobile phones, Android)

S
 Sexy Blocks (keypad-based mobile phones)
 Sacred Odyssey: Rise of Ayden (Android, iOS)
 Sexy Poker 2009 (keypad-based mobile phones, Wii)
 Shadow Guardian (Android, iOS)
 Shark Dash (Android)
 Shrek Forever After (keypad-based mobile phones, iOS)
 Shrek Kart (Android, Palm Pre, iOS)
 Shrek Party (keypad-based mobile phones)
 Shrek the Third (keypad-based mobile phones)
 Siberian Strike (Palm OS)
 Siberian Strike: Episode I (keypad-based mobile phones)
 Siberian Strike: Episode II (keypad-based mobile phones)
 Siberian Strike X (Pocket PC, Windows, Windows Mobile)
 Siberian Strike 3D (Android, iOS)
 Six-Guns (Android, Windows, Windows Phone, iOS)
 Skee-Ball (Android, Java ME mobile phones)
 Sky Gift (Series 30+)
 Smash It! (keypad-based mobile phones)
 Smash N Win (Series 30+)
 Snake (Series 30+)
 Special Crime Unit: Blood on Campus (keypad-based mobile phones)
 Speed Devils (keypad-based mobile phones)
 Spider-Man: Toxic City (keypad-based mobile phones)
 Spider-Man: Ultimate Power (keypad-based mobile phones)
 Spider-Man Unlimited (keypad-based mobile phones, Android)
 Sonic Runners Adventure (Android, iOS)
 Sonic Unleashed Mobile (keypad-based mobile phones, Android, iOS)
 Sonic Advance Mobile (keypad-based mobile phones, Android, iOS)
 Soul of Darkness (keypad-based mobile phones, Android, DSi)
 Starfront: Collision (Android, iOS)
 Star Battalion (Android, IOS, Symbian) 
 Surf's Up (keypad-based mobile phones)
 Sniper Fury (Android, iOS)
 Silent Ops (iOS)

T
 Tank Battles (PS3)
 Tetris (Series 30+)
 Tennis Open 2007
 Terminator Salvation (keypad-based mobile phones, iOS)
 The Adventures of Tintin: Secret of the Unicorn (keypad-based mobile phones, Android, iOS)
 The Blacklist: Conspiracy (Android, Windows, iOS)
 The Amazing Spider-Man (keypad-based mobile phones, touchscreen Java phones, Series 30+, Android, BlackBerry 10, iOS)
 The Amazing Spider-Man 2 (keypad-based mobile phones, touchscreen Java phones, Android, iOS)
 The Avengers: The Mobile Game (keypad-based mobile phones, Android)
 The Chronicles of Narnia: The Voyage of the Dawn Treader (keypad-based mobile phones)
 The Dark Knight Rises (keypad-based mobile phones, Android, Windows Phone, iOS)
 The Love Boat (keypad-based mobile phones, Android)
 The O.C. (based on the television series of the same name; keypad-based mobile phones)
 The Settlers (keypad-based mobile phones, iOS, Palm Pre)
 Tokyo City Nights (keypad-based mobile phones)
 Tom Clancy's Ghost Recon Advanced Warfighter 2 (keypad-based mobile phones)
 Tom Clancy's Ghost Recon: Future Soldier (keypad-based mobile phones, touchscreen Java phones, Android)
 Tom Clancy's Ghost Recon: Jungle Storm
 Tom Clancy's H.A.W.X (keypad-based mobile phones, Symbian, Android, iOS, Palm Pre)
 Tom Clancy's Rainbow Six 3 (keypad-based mobile phones)
 Tom Clancy's Rainbow Six: Lockdown (keypad-based mobile phones)
 Tom Clancy's Rainbow Six: Raven Shield (keypad-based mobile phones)
Tom Clancy's Rainbow Six: Shadow Vanguard (Android, iOS)
 Tom Clancy's Rainbow Six Vegas (keypad-based mobile phones)
 Tom Clancy's Splinter Cell (keypad-based mobile phones)
 Tom Clancy's Splinter Cell: Chaos Theory (keypad-based mobile phones, N-Gage)
 Tom Clancy's Splinter Cell: Conviction (keypad-based mobile phones, touchscreen Java phones, Android, iOS)
 Tom Clancy's Splinter Cell: Double Agent (keypad-based mobile phones)
 Tom Clancy's Splinter Cell: Extended Ops (keypad-based mobile phones)
 Tom Clancy's Splinter Cell: Pandora Tomorrow (keypad-based mobile phones)
 Total Conquest (keypad-based mobile phones, Android)
 Totally Spies!: The Mobile Game (based on the television series of the same name; keypad-based mobile phones)
 Trivial Pursuits & Friends
 Tropical Madness (keypad-based mobile phones)
 Turbo Jet Ski 3D (keypad-based mobile phones)
 TV Show King (iOS, PS3, Wii)
 TV Show King Party (Wii)

U
 Ultimate Spider-Man: Total Mayhem (BlackBerry Playbook, iOS)
 Ultimate Street Football (keypad-based mobile phones)
 Uno (keypad-based mobile phones, Android, iOS, BlackBerry PlayBook, Windows Phone, BlackBerry 10, Palm Pre, Xbox 360 (Arcade), DSi, Wii, PS3)
 Uno and Friends (keypad-based mobile phones, Android, iOS, Windows Phone, BlackBerry 10, BlackBerry PlayBook, Palm Pre, Xbox 360 (Arcade), PS3, DSi, Wii)
 Uno Rush (XBLA [Xbox 360])
 Uno Spin (keypad-based mobile phones)
 Urban Crime (Android, iOS)

V
 Vampire Romance (keypad-based mobile phones)

W
  War Planet Online (Android, iOS)
 War of the Worlds (keypad-based mobile phones)
 Wild Blood (video game) (Android, iOS)
 Wild West Guns (keypad-based mobile phones, Android, iOS, Wii)
 Wimbledon 2009
 Wonder Zoo (keypad-based mobile phones, Android)
  World at Arms (keypad-based mobile phones, Android, iOS)

X
 XIII (keypad-based mobile phones)
 XIII: Covert Identity (keypad-based mobile phones)

Z
 Zombie Infection (keypad-based mobile phones, Android, iOS)
 Zombie Infection 2 (keypad-based mobile phones, Android, iOS)
 Zombiewood (keypad-based mobile phones, Android, iOS)

References

 
Gameloft